Mount Mathew is a peak,  high, standing at the east side of Starshot Glacier,  north of Mount Hotine, in the Surveyors Range, Antarctica. It was named by the New Zealand Geological Survey Antarctic Expedition (1960–61) for Felton Mathew, the first Surveyor-General of New Zealand, in 1840.

References

Mountains of Oates Land